The Oley Valley is a valley  northeast of Reading, Pennsylvania. It covers all of Oley, Pike, Ruscombmanor, Alsace, and part of Exeter Township. The valley is drained by Manatawny and Pine Creeks, and is a part of the Schuylkill River system. At the center of the valley is the village of Oley. The village has a strong historical heritage. In March 1983, the entire Township of Oley was listed on the National Register of Historic Places.

History

Native Americans
Before European settlers arrived the valley was home to a tribe of Delaware (Lenni-Lenape). In fact it was the Native Americans that gave Oley its name. In Lenape, Olink means kettle, which is roughly the shape of the valley, which was an important meeting place for Native Americans. The Sacred Oak, which is located about one mile (1.6 km) from Main Street is a more-than-500-year-old Oak tree at which the Lenape made treaties and settled differences.

The first European settlers arrived in the Oley Valley in the early 1700s. When they arrived they found prosperous Lenape villages and fields of corn. The settlers and the Native Americans existed peacefully for many years with some of the Indians converting to Christianity. However, when the French and Indian War began relations between the settlers and the Lenape became strained. One day it was reported that a nearby farmer had been killed by Indians and the entire town gathered in the largest house. That night sentries were posted and all men with their muskets were positioned at small firing ports cut in the building's wall. The next morning a man was seen walking down the road, at first perceived to be an Indian it turned out to be the farmer who had supposedly been murdered. The farmer had no knowledge of his supposed death and informed the townspeople that in the middle of the night all the Lenape had disappeared from the Oley Valley. It is believed that Native Americans of the Valley left to fight in the war although it is still a mystery since none of them ever returned. The Indians' dwellings were left standing and undisturbed for many years until the last house collapsed in 1856.

The settlers
The first European settlers in the Oley Valley arrived in the early 1700s. The settlers were primarily German along with French Huguenots and Swiss seeking religious freedom. One of the Valley's early residents was Mordecai Lincoln, the great-grandfather of Abraham Lincoln the 16th President of United States. The Lincoln Homestead can still be seen and visited in what is now Exeter Township. The Moravian Church had a Congregation for a time in Oley and operated one of the first schools in the area. The first settler, named John Palmer Fleck of Wyomissing, moved to the Maxatawny region of the Oley Valley

Another one of the Valley's early residents was the Boone family. Daniel Boone the famous pioneer was born in Oley in 1734. Oley played an important role during the early days of the Revolutionary War. During George Washington's encampment at Valley Forge, Oley's farmers sent large amounts of food along with cannonballs made at the Oley Furnace to bolster Washington's army.

The "Annals of Oley Valley" were written in 1926 and continue to be a genealogical resource to this day. The town was originally named "Friedensburg" but that was changed after World War II because it was too often confused with a different Friedensburg PA located farther north.

Prior to World War II, Pennsylvania Dutch was still the primary language of the native residents. After the war use of the language decreased and today it is only fluently spoken by the older residents of the valley. Even though the language is almost gone a strong heritage remains among the people of the valley.

The American poet Wallace Stevens was raised in Reading, and the Oley Valley influenced some of his poetry. Stevens' poem "Credences of Summer" (published in his 1947 collection Transport to Summer) alludes to the valley:

Mountain Mary
One of the most prominent people in the history of early Oley was Mountain Mary. Originally Anna Maria Jung, she was a German immigrant who practiced the art of Braucherei, commonly known as pow-wow. Her knowledge of herbal remedies for various ailments is the basis of her notoriety, even today. She was a resource for those seeking advice and offered remedies and comfort to the sick. She kept one cow and did her own baking and some light farming, common for the era, but made her income primarily by keeping bees and making butter. Her secluded log cabin on a ridge above Pikeville, where she lived a reclusive life with her two sisters, no longer stands, but her spring house survives on a farm along Mountain Mary Road. The 1790 Census, the nation's first, lists Mountain Mary as an "abbess," suggesting that her home was seen as a kind of convent. She met her own death after becoming ill in November 1819.

Community
Oley is the small village located at the center of the Oley Valley. It sits at the intersection of PA Route 73 and PA Route 662.

Businesses
At the corner of Main St and Friedensburg Rd, considered to be the heart of the village, sits an historic building most recently operated as the Oley Valley Inn which combined a fine restaurant and a bed and breakfast. Former establishments at this location include a formal French restaurant (The Inn At Oley) and a tavern. After 17 years of operation, a substantial fire in May 2005 shut down the Oley Valley Inn for 7 months. The Inn reopened and operated until March 2008 at which time it closed permanently due to financial and legal issues.  the building remained unopened after being taken off the market in 2009.

Ernst Licht Embroidery and Imports, considered by some to be world famous for its authentic German clothing, is also located at the corner of Main St and Friedensburg Rd. To the south along Main St is Four Seasons Sporting Goods which has operated for over 30 years serving the community with hunting and fishing supplies. The Oley Fire Company and the associated Fire Company Fairgrounds are also located on Main St.

A Weis supermarket (King's, or the IGA as it is called by the locals) sits on the corner of Rte 73 and Friedensburg Rd. Also in the supermarket complex called King's Plaza is Nia's, an Italian restaurant/pizzeria, as well as Village Salon, a hair and nails salon. There are plenty of places to eat in Oley. The M&M sandwich shop sits in between the Oley Valley Inn and the supermarket. Built in a barn, the M&M is a popular place to eat for kids coming from the high school, which is located on Jefferson St. Across Rte 73, there is Bella Italia, another Italian restaurant. A Dunkin' Donuts operates along Rte 73 in the building that formerly housed the Oley Legion Diner. Christman's Meat market, a small family-owned butcher shop, is a local historical spot which has been located on Rte 73 for 30 years.

Pine Brook Farm is located just off of DeTurk Road on Gotwals Lane.  The once dairy farm encompasses over 300 acres of farm land and has grown to house Gotwals Trucking, Brook Ledge Horse Transportation and Xpressway.  Pine Brook Farm was purchased by the Gotwals Brothers in 1957 and retains the original DeTurk house on the property.

The Oley Fair
In 1946, the Oley Valley Community Fair Association was officially established. A year later the first annual Oley Valley Community Fair was held on October 2-October 4. The first Oley Fair included exhibits of locally produced goods, exhibits from local businesses, entertainment, and food.

The Oley Fair originally began on the Oley School grounds. Classes were dismissed early in order to set up for the fair, in fact, students continue to be dismissed early on the Friday during the week of the fair. Various exhibits were housed inside the school including the Home Economics, Fruit and Vegetable Departments, as well as some commercial displays. A few Oley citizens lent money to the Fair to purchase surplus tents from the Army. These tents were erected on the playing fields behind the school to house the Farm Crops and Livestock.

In 1958, building expansions on the Oley School grounds limited the availability of buildings to the Fair Association. For this reason other locations were considered and the Oley Fire Company grounds, which were adjacent to the school grounds, were selected as an alternate location for the fair. The fair was also able to purchase  of land adjacent to the Oley Fire Company grounds which is used for additional parking. All of these projects have helped to better display and promote many of the fair's exhibits and activities.

The Oley Fair still continues strong to this day with the Fair celebrating its 60th anniversary in 2006. The Fair has become a community tradition and some people work hard for the entire year to grow a prize-winning fruit or vegetable. The Fair offers the people of the Valley an opportunity to show their prize-winning livestock, produce, and handiwork. The Fair is also famous for its food, which is prepared by volunteers, not commercial vendors, and is cooked in traditional 
Pennsylvania Dutch style.

Reading Motorcycle Club

Oley is home to the Reading Motorcycle club which has met annually in Oley for the past 65 years.  Officially, the Reading Motorcycle Club is 97 years old. Although research has turned up evidence of an organized motorcycle club in Reading as early as 1905, it wasn't until 1914 that the club was officially incorporated. Oley is home to a rural community which welcomes the motorcycle community.

Recent Development of the Oley Valley
Starting the summer of 2006 the construction of two developments began in Oley. One development is being built at Cricket Slopes with 12 homes and another at Middlecreek Farms with 35 homes. These are the first large scale developments to be built in the Valley in almost 30 years. Many people have complained that these developments harm the rural and historical heritage of Oley, as well as increase the taxes, and the local government has put zoning in place to protect/preserve the prime farmland. In 2008, construction began on a new building to house the Post Office and the Oley Fire Company Ambulance. The Post Office and Fire Company began using the building in late 2009.

In 2012, an Old Order Mennonite community was established in the Oley Valley, buying two large farms. The Old Order Mennonites in the area belong to the Groffdale Conference Mennonite Church and use the horse and buggy as transportation.

See also
Oley Valley High School
Oley Township, Pennsylvania

References

External links
Oley Valley: Schuylkill River Heritage Area

Landforms of Berks County, Pennsylvania
Regions of Pennsylvania
Valleys of Pennsylvania